Agnes Robertson may refer to

Agnes Kelly Robertson (1833–1916), American actress
Agnes Robertson Robertson (1882–1968), Australian politician
Agnes Jane Robertson (1893–1959), British historian